William Merritt may refer to:

William Merritt (mayor) (died 1708), Dutch politician
William Hamilton Merritt (1793–1862), Canadian politician
William Hamilton Merritt III (1855–1918), Canadian soldier

See also
Bill Merritt (disambiguation)